Andrew Landenberger (born 15 September 1966) is an Australian competitive sailor and Olympic medalist. He won a silver medal in the Tornado class at the 1996 Summer Olympics in Atlanta, together with Mitch Booth.

Life and Career 
Born in Grafton, New South Wales, Landenberger started building sails in Australia under his own label in 1987. The first sails were produced on his parents living room floor with a sewing machine he bought for $50.

By 1989 he claimed his first clean sweep winning the State, National and World Championships in the International Moth Class. Despite spending several years obtaining a Bachelor of Economics Degree, Landenberger's desire to build fast sails always drove him to devote full attention to sailing and the technology side of sail making.

By 1996 Landenberger had won an Olympic silver medal in the Tornado Class together with Mitch Booth. Since then the full energy has been devoted to sail making.

In 2001 Landenberger made the decision to move with his family to Germany. Landenberger One Design has developed into a business of eight staff specializing mostly in One Design Classes. The production is headed up by Felix Egner who has been with the company since 2004. Despite little time for sailing Landenberger and Egner have sailed two regattas together in the past two years "just for fun" but managed to finish 1st in the 2005 Topcat K1 World Championships and 3rd in the 2006 F18 World Championships. Landenberger is currently spending time sailing in the Star class to develop a new range of sail for the loft. Both the development process and the production techniques are heavily orientated around computer software. Sail making has moved on from an art to an exact science. On average the process we adopt to develop sails in new classes brings us to a very competitive product within three prototypes. This is far quicker than most other One Design lofts can manage who often make a not stop progression of random changes searching for any hint of improvement in performance.

In 2007 Landenberger build a second home in Australia on the banks of the Clarence River. Here he has an extensive design loft where he can develop sails and escape the European winter. Although he spends more time these days designing sails he still remains one of the world's leading multihull sailors.

Landenberger is a descendant of the noted nineteenth-century sculler Michael Rush.

References

External links
 

1966 births
Living people
Australian male sailors (sport)
Sailors at the 1996 Summer Olympics – Tornado
Olympic sailors of Australia
Olympic silver medalists for Australia
Olympic medalists in sailing
People from Grafton, New South Wales
Medalists at the 1996 Summer Olympics
Sportsmen from New South Wales